William Kenny (born 23 October 1951) is a former professional footballer who played for Everton, Tranmere Rovers and Ashton United.

He is the father of Billy Kenny, Jr., also a former professional footballer.

References 

Living people
1951 births
Everton F.C. players
Tranmere Rovers F.C. players
Ashton United F.C. players
English footballers
Association football midfielders
Footballers from Liverpool
Cleveland Cobras players
English expatriate footballers
Expatriate soccer players in the United States
English Football League players
English expatriate sportspeople in the United States